East Falls Church may refer to:

East Falls Church, Virginia, an unincorporated community in Arlington County
East Falls Church (WMATA station)